This is a list of countries by magnesium production in 2018 based on United States Geological Survey figures and US capacity figures.

Countries 

* indicates "Natural resources of COUNTRY or TERRITORY" links.

References

Lists of countries by mineral production
Magnesium